The Widow's Investment is a 1914 American silent short drama film starring Charlotte Burton, Sydney Ayres, Jack Richardson, Perry Banks, Edith Borella, Caroline Cooke, Vivian Rich, and Harry Van Meter.

External links

1914 films
1914 drama films
Silent American drama films
American silent short films
American black-and-white films
1914 short films
Films directed by Lorimer Johnston
1910s American films
1910s English-language films
American drama short films